Senipisi Langi Kavaliku (1939 – 3 December 2008), styled Hon. Hu’akavameiliku, was a Tongan scholar and politician. He served as a Cabinet Minister for 35 years, and was Deputy Prime Minister of Tonga in the 1990s. He was the first Tongan to obtain a master's degree and a PhD.

Early life
Kavaliku was educated at Harvard University, graduating with a Bachelor of Arts, before obtaining a Master of Arts from the University of Cambridge. In 1966 he completed a PhD from Victoria University of Wellington, with a thesis was on "Educational reorganization for national development in Tonga".

Political career 
Shortly after graduating he was appointed to Cabinet as Minister Without Portfolio. In early 1968 he was appointed acting Minister of Finance while Mahe 'Uli'uli Tupouniua was seeking medical treatment in New Zealand. In 1969 he was serving as Minister of Education and Works. In 1969 he was granted the royal chiefly title of Hu'akavameiliku. He served as pro-chancellor of the University of the South Pacific from 1976 - 81, and again from 2000 - 2006.

He served as deputy prime minister for over 20 years. He retired from politics in 2000. Following the 2005 Tongan public service strike he was appointed to the National Committee for Political Reform which recommended a transition to democracy.

Death 
On 3 December 2008, he was killed in a car accident when his car struck a mound of rocks.

Family 
His son Siaosi Sovaleni is the current Prime Minister of Tonga.

References 

1939 births
2008 deaths
Harvard University alumni
Alumni of the University of Cambridge
Victoria University of Wellington alumni
Tongan academics
Deputy Prime Ministers of Tonga
Government ministers of Tonga
Members of the Legislative Assembly of Tonga
Road incident deaths in Tonga
Academic staff of the University of the South Pacific